Méhtelek is a village in Szabolcs-Szatmár-Bereg county, in the Northern Great Plain region of eastern Hungary.

Geography

History
The village was somewhat put on the map after catastrophic floods in the region in the late 1960s. Valuable archaeological findspossibly going back to 5000 BCwere uncovered during the reconstruction of the settlement.

References

Populated places in Szabolcs-Szatmár-Bereg County